Nenad Nešić (born 4 July 1978) is a Bosnian Serb politician serving as Minister of Security since January 2023. He previously served as member of the House of Representatives from 2018 to 2022. He is president of the Democratic People's Alliance.

Early life and education
Nešić was born on 4 July 1978 in Sarajevo. He graduated at the University of Novi Sad Faculty of Law. He worked in the Ministry of Interior of Republika Srpska.

Political career
A member of the Democratic People's Alliance (DNS), Nešić was the acting director of the state-owned company Putevi Republike Srpske from 2016 to 2020. In the 2018 Bosnian general election, he was elected member of the national House of Representatives. Nešić was elected president of DNS in 2020, succeeding Marko Pavić. Under his leadership, the DNS left the ruling SNSD-led coalition in Republika Srpska and became an opposition party.

On 2 March 2022, Nešić announced his candidacy in the Bosnian general election, running for Bosnia and Herzegovina's three-person Presidency member, representing the Serbs. At the general election however, held on 2 October 2022, he was not elected, obtaining only 5.51% of the vote.

On 25 January 2023, following the formation of a new Council of Ministers presided over by Borjana Krišto, Nešić was appointed as the new Minister of Security within Krišto's government.

References

External links

1978 births
Living people
Politicians from Sarajevo
Serbs of Bosnia and Herzegovina
University of Novi Sad alumni
Democratic People's Alliance politicians
Members of the House of Representatives (Bosnia and Herzegovina)
Government ministers of Bosnia and Herzegovina
Security ministers of Bosnia and Herzegovina